Garidepally is a census town in the Suryapet district of Telangana, India. It is the headquarters of the Garidepally mandal of the Suryapet revenue division. It is located 33 kilometres from its district headquarters in Suryapet.

Geography

Demographics
Garidepally has a population of 10,836, composed of 5,419 women and 5,417 men based on the 2011 Census of India. The literacy rate of the village as of 2011 was 64.81 %,  whereas male literacy stands at 74.62 % and female literacy rate is 55.08 %.

Politics
Garidepally is represented by the Huzurnagar Assembly constituency and the village is administrated by a Sarpanch, who is elected by residents of the village.

Temples
Garidepally is a location of many temples, such as the famous Ramalayam Temple, Hanuman temple, Shri Ramalingeshwara Temple, Shri Dharmashstra Ayyappa temple, Sai Baba Temple and the temple of Lord Venkateshara.

Agriculture
Most of the people in this village are dependent on paddy crop cultivation.

References

Cities and towns in Suryapet district
Mandal headquarters in Suryapet district